The Multi-Platform Radar Technology Insertion Program (MP-RTIP), a U.S. Air Force project led by contractor Northrop Grumman to develop the next generation of airborne air-to-air and air-to-ground radar systems. While initially planned for multiple platforms, the MP-RTIP is currently intended only for the RQ-4B Global Hawk UAV.

Overview
The MP-RTIP is a "modular, active electronically scanned array radar system" designed to be scaled in size in order to fit on board different platforms. The system is being developed from earlier Northrop-Grumman radar systems, including the Joint Surveillance Target Attack Radar System (JointSTARS) and the existing Global Hawk system. The next-generation system will improve the Air Force's ability to track slow-moving ground vehicles and low-flying cruise missiles. The primary improvements are a dramatic increase in resolution and an ability "to collect ground moving target indicator imagery and synthetic aperture radar still images simultaneously".

The Global Hawk, which currently is an air-to-ground radar platform, was originally due to receive air-to-air capability through the MP-RTIP. That capability was subsequently removed from the test program's budget, however, in a reversal, funding for an air-to-air capability is being restored.

Development
Phase I of the development program began in December, 2000. The three-year program was undertaken by Northrop Grumman at a contract cost of $410 million, and focused on the basic design of the radar system. Phase II is a six-year, $888 million contract awarded by the Air Force's Electronic Systems Center in May, 2004, under which the radar system is being developed, tested and integrated. Raytheon's Space and Airborne Systems is a subcontractor on the program, tasked with hardware development. Phase II calls for the production of six systems, three for Global Hawk and three for the E-10.

The Global Hawk's system is the first to be flight tested, a program for which Northrop Grumman is using its Proteus aircraft (built by Scaled Composites). The MP-RTIP is mounted in a large pod fitted under Proteus. The program, jointly conducted by Northrop-Grumman and the Air Force's 851st Electronic Systems Group, is being operated from the Mojave Spaceport.

Eventually, the entire program is expected to cost $2 billion. With the E-10 program cancellation, five E-8 JointSTARS aircraft are expected to be retrofitted with the MP-RTIP.

References

Radar networks
Military radars